Paolo Rizzi (born 30 April 1969 in Calcinate) is an Italian retired footballer. He played as a defender. He played for Atalanta youth teams and he made his debut in Serie A on 26 February 1989 against Hellas Verona. At the end of the season Genoa was relegated in Serie B, where Matteo played one match. Then he played for Leffe and Albinese.

Career 
1986-1987 Atalanta 0 (0) 
1987-1988 → L.R. Vicenza 0 (0) 
1988-1989 Atalanta 1 (0) 
1989-1993 Leffe 57 (0) 
1993-1995 Albinese 61 (3) 
1999-2003 Ghisalbese 49 (0)

External links 
 

1969 births
Living people
Italian footballers
Association football defenders